The following lists events that happened in 1917 in El Salvador.

Incumbents
President: Carlos Meléndez Ramírez
Vice President: Alfonso Quiñónez Molina

Events

Undated
 C.D. Santiagueño, a Salvadoran football club, was established.

Births
 7 July – Fidel Sánchez Hernández, politician (d. 2003)
 15 August – Óscar Romero, Catholic archbishop (d. 1980)

References

 
El Salvador
1910s in El Salvador
Years of the 20th century in El Salvador
El Salvador